Zarathustra's roundelay, also called the Midnight Song or Once More, is a poem in the book Thus Spoke Zarathustra (1883–1885) by Friedrich Nietzsche.

The poem first appears in Thus Spoke Zarathustra's chapter "The Second Dance-Song", then reappears in a later chapter, "The Drunken Song".

German original

Selected English translations 
Alexander Tille:

Thomas Common:

Textual characteristics

Interpretation

See also 

 Philosophy of Friedrich Nietzsche
 God is dead
 Apollonian and Dionysian

References

Further reading

External links 
—English

1883 poems
German poems
Poetry by Friedrich Nietzsche
Thus Spoke Zarathustra